David Olatunde Aradeon (born 7 November 1933) is a Nigerian architect, urban planner and curator.

Career
David Aradeon was born in Lagos, and commenced his Architectural education in 1959 at Columbia University in New York. After his graduation in 1966, he worked for three different architectural firms in New York and then returned to Nigeria.  In 1968, he was awarded a three-year Ford Fellowship to study the human settlements in western and North Africa. At the University of Lagos, he was a lecturer in the Department of Architecture, where he was appointed Professor in 1979.
Aradeon founded the Sankore Institute for African Environment and Development in Lagos, which he still heads today. He co-founded the non-profit organization Build with Earth for the promotion of Building with earth. In 1977, he curated the African Architectural Technology Exhibition for the Festival of African Cultures in Lagos. He was curator of the exhibition "Views of Lagos" and at the ifa galleries in Stuttgart 2004-2005 Berlin has been shown, In 2007, his research focused on Movement of Forms, Antecedents of Afro-Brazilian Spaces.
Aradeon is licensed as an Architect in Nigeria. In addition to his academic work as a lecturer, he was also the founding partner of  the architectural firm; Studio 4 Associates shown at Documenta 12 in Kassel

He designed, among other projects, residential buildings in Ibadan and Lagos, the elementary school buildings for the University of Lagos Women Society, the entire Campus of the Lagos State University (1988), the showrooms and offices of the National Council of Arts and Culture in Iganmu, Lagos,  the auditorium of the University of Port Harcourt and the National Cultural Complex in Abuja (2003). 
Aradeon lives and works in Lagos.

Selected publications
 

 Zusammen mit Siyanbola Tomori und Ajato Gandonu: Medium and small size settlement in development strategy, Porto Novo region, Nigeria. Towards alternative settlement strategies: the role of small and intermediate centers in the development process. Heritage Publishers, New York 1980.

See also
 List of Nigerian architects

References

External links

Living people
1933 births
Architects from Lagos
Columbia Graduate School of Architecture, Planning and Preservation alumni
Academic staff of the University of Lagos
Urban designers
Nigerian expatriates in the United States
Nigerian curators
Nigerian urban planners
Architecture educators
20th-century Nigerian architects
21st-century Nigerian architects
Recipients of the Nigerian National Order of Merit Award